Jack Holborn was a 1982 ZDF Adventure TV mini-series. The story is based on the 1964 book by Leon Garfield. It was shown in the United Kingdom by ITV.

Plot
Jack Holborn is a 13-year-old boy living in an orphanage in late 18th-century Bristol. Jack was found on the steps of a convent in Holborn in London when he was a toddler. He was wearing a leather armband with the name "Jack" on it. The nuns therefore called him Jack Holborn.

Jack wants to go to sea, but is put in a foster home instead. He runs away in order to join the crew of the "Charming Molly", a privateering vessel commanded by Captain Sheringham. At the sight of Jack's armband, the Captain unwittingly reveals that it looks familiar, but he won't tell Jack what he knows and refuses to keep him aboard.

Jack is desperately seeking answers to the mystery of his origins, and is not about to let the Captain off the hook. Meanwhile, the judge Lord Sheringham, who hates his twin brother the privateer for the dishonour that his side dealings with pirates have brought on their family, plans to bring the Captain to justice. Jack eventually manages to stow himself away on board the "Charming Molly," and the journey begins. A journey that will feature piracy, traveling through swamps and slavery.

Cast

External links
 
 Filming Locations

1982 German television series debuts
1982 German television series endings
1980s German television miniseries
Adventure television series
Children's adventure television series
German-language television shows
German children's television series
Television series about orphans
Television series about teenagers
Television series set in the 18th century
Television shows based on British novels
Television shows based on children's books
ZDF original programming